"Asthena" eurychora is a moth in the family Geometridae first described by Louis Beethoven Prout in 1928. It is found in western Samoa.

Taxonomy
The species does not belong to the genus Asthena or even the tribe Asthenini, but has not been moved to another genus.

References

Moths described in 1928
Asthena
Moths of Oceania